Klinga may refer to:

People
Klinga (surname), a list of people with the surname Klinga

Places
Klinga, Germany, a place in Saxony, Germany
Klinga, Norway, a village in the municipality of Namsos in Trøndelag county, Norway
Klinga (municipality), a former municipality now in the municipality of Namsos in Trøndelag county, Norway
Klinga Church, a church in the municipality of Namsos in Trøndelag county, Norway

See also
Klingen (disambiguation)